Rules of Engagement is an American sitcom that ran on CBS from February 5, 2007 to May 20, 2013. A total of 100 original episodes have been produced over seven seasons.

Series overview 
{| class="wikitable plainrowheaders" style="text-align:center;"
|-
! scope="col" colspan="2" rowspan="2" | Season
! scope="col" rowspan="2" | Episodes
! scope="col" colspan="2" | Originally aired
|-
! scope="col" | First aired
! scope="col" style="padding: 0 8px;"| Last aired
|-
| scope="row" style="background:#f08080;"|
| [[List of Rules of Engagement episodes#Season 1 (2007)|1]]
| 7
| 
| 
|-
| scope="row" style="background:#699ACA;"|
| [[List of Rules of Engagement episodes#Season 2 (2007–08)|2]]
| 15
| 
| 
|-
| scope="row" style="background:#3cb371;"|
| [[List of Rules of Engagement episodes#Season 3 (2009)|3]]
| 13
| 
| 
|-
| scope="row" style="background:#fada00;"|
| [[List of Rules of Engagement episodes#Season 4 (2010)|4]]
| 13
| 
| 
|-
| scope="row" style="background:#906;"|
| [[List of Rules of Engagement episodes#Season 5 (2010–11)|5]]
| 24
| 
| 
|-
| scope="row" style="background:#FF6052;"|
| [[List of Rules of Engagement episodes#Season 6 (2011–12)|6]]
| 15
| 
| 
|-
| scope="row" style="background:#2040bf;"|
| [[List of Rules of Engagement episodes#Season 7 (2013)|7]]
| 13
| 
| 
|}

Episodes

Season 1 (2007)

Season 2 (2007–08)

Season 3 (2009)

Season 4 (2010)

Season 5 (2010–11)

Season 6 (2011–12)

Season 7 (2013)

Ratings

References

External links 
Rules of Engagement - Official site
 

Lists of American romance television series episodes
Lists of American sitcom episodes
Lists of sex comedy television series episodes